Alexis de Armond (born 4 April 1997) is a field hockey player from Canada.

Personal life
Alexis de Armond was born and raised in Victoria, British Columbia.

Career

Under–21
De Armond made her debut for the Canadian U–21 team in 2016 at the Pan American Junior Championship in Tacarigua.

National team
Alexis de Armond debuted for the national team in 2017 during a test series against the United States in Chula Vista.

She won her first medal in 2022, taking home bronze at the Pan American Cup in Santiago. Later that year she was named in the squad for the FIH World Cup in Amsterdam and Terrassa.

References

External links

Alexis de Armond at Field Hockey Canada

1997 births
Living people
Canadian female field hockey players
Female field hockey midfielders